Monnet may refer to:

Surname:
Alexandre Monnet, C.S.Sp. (1812–1849), French bishop of the Roman Catholic Church
Antoine-Grimoald Monnet (1734–1817), French mineralogist and mining expert
Claude Monnet a French DJ
Franck Monnet (born 1967), French Singer-songwriter
Georges Monnet (1898–1980), prominent socialist politician in 1930s France
Jean Monnet (1888–1979), regarded by many as a chief architect of European Unity
Jean Monnet (director) (1703–1785), French theatre impresario and writer
Kévin Monnet-Paquet (born 1988), French footballer
Léon Emmanuel Monnet, the Minister of Mines and Energy of Côte d'Ivoire and the governor of Adzopé
Louis Claude Monnet de Lorbeau (1766–1819), French general who failed to prevent the landing of the Walcheren expedition
Marc Monnet, French composer
Philippe Monnet (born 1959), single-handed sailor from France
Thibaut Monnet (born 1982), Swiss professional ice hockey right wing

Places:
Monnet-la-Ville, commune in the Jura department in Franche-Comté in eastern France
Mont-sur-Monnet, commune in the Jura department in Franche-Comté in eastern France

See also
Jean Monnet Foundation for Europe, organisation which supports initiatives dedicated to the construction of European unity
Jean Monnet Programme, European Commission initiative to encourage teaching, research and reflection in European integration studies
Jean Monnet University (Université Jean Monnet) is a French public university, based in Saint-Étienne
Monnet Authority, the first High Authority of the European Coal and Steel Community (ECSC), between 1952 and 1955
Monnet Plan, reconstruction plan for France proposed by French civil servant Jean Monnet after the end of World War II

Not to be confused with
Monet (disambiguation)